Alicia "JoJo" Starbuck (born February 14, 1951, Birmingham, Alabama), is an American figure skater. With partner Kenneth Shelley, she is a three-time United States pair skating champion (1970–72) and two-time Olympian (1968, 1972).

Early life and youth career
Starbuck was raised in Downey, California and attended Cerritos College, along with Kenneth Shelley. She was first paired with Shelley for a show in 1959, when they were small children. They started training with coach John Nicks at the Arctic Blades FSC in 1961.

Championship career
In their first year of senior competitions, at age 16, they qualified to compete at the 1968 Winter Olympics. Both Starbuck and Shelley attended Downey High School, where they performed off-ice lifts with the cheerleading squad, and Long Beach State College.

Like Shelley, Starbuck was a skilled singles skater. While Shelley went on to win the national title in singles as well as pairs in 1972, Starbuck retired from singles competition in 1968.

Success became found though in pairs. 
With Shelley became they did three-time United States pair skating champion (1970–72) and two-time Olympian (1968, 1972). In the first Olympics they finished 13th, in the second 4th.

Later career
After turning professional, Starbuck made occasional appearances skating singles in addition to continuing to skate pairs with Shelley. She partnered John Curry in the "Tango Tango" number from his show Ice Dancing.

Starbuck performed for a short time with the Ice Capades. From 1976-83, she was married to football quarterback Terry Bradshaw. She was Bradshaw's second wife. During this time she also became well known as the face of Cup of Noodles, introducing  millions of Americans for the first time to ramen.

Starbuck currently is affiliated with the Rink at Rockefeller Plaza  a position she has had since the 1990s.

She had a minor career as an actress, performing in New York Stories (1989), The Cutting Edge (1992), and the TV movie Beauty and the Beast: A Concert on Ice (1996).

She continues to coach and choreograph.  Starbuck lives in Madison, New Jersey, where she teaches at the Essex Skating Club of New Jersey.

Results
(pairs with Kenneth Shelley)

References

External links
 Essex Skating Club
 

1951 births
American female pair skaters
Olympic figure skaters of the United States
Figure skaters at the 1972 Winter Olympics
Living people
People from Madison, New Jersey
World Figure Skating Championships medalists
Sportspeople from Downey, California
21st-century American women